Bislish  is a portmanteau of the words Bisaya and English, which refers to any of the Visayan languages of the Philippines macaronically infused with English terms. It is an example of code mixing. The earliest use of the term Bislish dates from 1999.

An example of Bislish as spoken in Cebuano-speaking areas would be, "Tired na jud ko my friend, how far pa house nimo?" which means "I am so tired already my friend. How far is your house?". Another example in Hiligaynon-speaking areas is "Lagaw kita at the park, magkit-anay ta sa friends naton didto.", which means "Let's stroll at the park, we'll meet our friends there."

See also
 Pseudo-anglicism
Bisalog, Bisaya languages infused with Tagalog.
 Bisakol, a hybrid language of Bikol and Bisaya.
 Hokaglish, a mixed language of Philippine Hokkien, Tagalog, and Philippine English
 Taglish, a mixture language of Tagalog and American English or Philippine English

Footnotes

Cebuano language
Hiligaynon language
Macaronic forms of English